Stockman may refer to:

Stockman (Australia), a person who looks after livestock on a station
Stockman (surname), a surname
Rancher, an owner of a North American livestock ranch operation
Cowman (profession), owner or operator of a cattle business
Dairy farmer, owner or manager of a dairy farm
Stock contractor, in the United States, contractor who supplies livestock, especially for rodeo
Shepherd, a person who looks after sheep in the fields

See also 
 Station (Australian agriculture)#Personnel
 Stockgrower (disambiguation)
 Stockmann (disambiguation)
 Shtokman field, named after Vladimir Shtokman (Stockmann)
 Stockman's Lash
 Australian Stockman's Hall of Fame
 The Phantom Stockman, a 1953 Australian film
 Dr. G.C. Stockman House, by Frank Lloyd Wright